The Democratic Farmers' Party of Germany (DBD) was an East German political party.  The DBD was founded in 1948. It had 52 representatives in the Volkskammer, as part of the National Front. The DBD participated in all GDR cabinets (with the exception of the last GDR cabinet). The founding of the DBD was an attempt by the SED to weaken the influence of CDU/LDPD in the rural community by establishing a party loyal to the SED. The leadership cadre came mainly from the ranks of the SED. In the late 1980s, the party had 117,000 members.

After the fall of Berlin Wall, the party initially tried to find itself a niche as ecological agrarian party, but the first free Volkskammer election (1990) netted it only nine seats. In 1990 the DBD merged with the Christian Democratic Union.

International contacts

The DBD had friendly relations with peasants' parties in other Eastern Bloc countries. It had close contacts with the Polish United People's Party (Zjednoczone Stronnictwo Ludowe, ZSL) and the Bulgarian Agrarian National Union (Bǔlgarski Zemedelski Naroden Sǔyuz, BZNS). Besides that, there were some contacts with farmers' associations in West Germany. They had also some contacts with agrarian parties in Finland (Centre Party) and in Sweden (Centre Party).

Electoral history

Volkskammer elections

Chairmen of the DBD
 Ernst Goldenbaum, 1948–1982
 Ernst Mecklenburg, 1982–1987
 Günther Maleuda, 1987–1990
 Ulrich Junghanns, 1990

References

External links
Deutsche Bauernpartei from chronik der wende

1948 establishments in Germany
1990 disestablishments in East Germany
Political parties in East Germany
Agrarian parties in Germany
Political parties established in 1948
Political parties disestablished in 1990
Defunct political parties in Germany